The Juglandaceae are a plant family known as the walnut family. They are trees, or sometimes shrubs, in the order Fagales. Members of this family are native to the Americas, Eurasia, and Southeast Asia.

The nine or ten genera in the family have a total of around 50 species, and include the commercially important nut-producing trees walnut (Juglans), pecan (Carya illinoinensis), and hickory (Carya). The Persian walnut, Juglans regia, is one of the major nut crops of the world. Walnut, hickory, and gaulin are also valuable timber trees while pecan wood is also valued as cooking fuel.

Description
Members of the walnut family have large, aromatic leaves that are usually alternate, but opposite in Alfaroa and Oreomunnea. The leaves are pinnately compound or ternate, and usually 20–100 cm long. The trees are wind-pollinated, and the flowers are usually arranged in catkins.

The fruits of the Juglandaceae are often confused with drupes but are accessory fruit because the outer covering of the fruit is technically an involucre and thus not morphologically part of the carpel; this means it cannot be a drupe but is instead a drupe-like nut.

Taxonomy
The known living genera are grouped into subfamilies, tribes, and subtribes as follows:

 Subfamily Rhoipteleoideae Reveal
 Rhoiptelea Diels & Hand.-Mazz. 1932
 Subfamily Engelhardioideae Iljinskaya 1990
 Alfaroa Standl. 1927—gaulin
 Engelhardia Lesch. ex Blume 1825–1826—cheo
 Oreomunnea Oerst. 1856
 Subfamily Juglandoideae Eaton 1836
 Tribe Platycaryeae Nakai 1933
 Platycarya Siebold & Zucc. 1843
 Tribe Juglandeae Rchb. 1832
 Subtribe Caryinae D.E. Stone & P. S. Manos 2001
 Carya Nutt. 1818—hickory and pecan
 Annamocarya A.Chev. 1941 (sometimes included in Carya)
 Subtribe Juglandinae D.E. Stone & P. S. Manos 2001
 Cyclocarya Iljinsk 1953—wheel wingnut
 Juglans L. 1753—walnut
 Pterocarya Kunth 1824—wingnut

Systematics
Modern molecular phylogenetics suggest the following relationships:

References

 
Rosid families